The 2017 Kangaroo Cup was a professional tennis tournament played on outdoor hard courts. It was the twenty-second edition of the tournament and part of the 2017 ITF Women's Circuit, offering a total of $80,000 in prize money. It took place in Gifu, Japan, from 1–7 May 2017.

Singles main draw entrants

Seeds 

 1 Rankings as of 24 April 2017

Other entrants 
The following players received wildcards into the singles main draw:
  Kimiko Date
  Yuika Sano
  Ayano Shimizu
  Miki Ukai

The following players received entry into the singles main draw by a protected ranking:
  Magdaléna Rybáriková

The following players received entry from the qualifying draw:
  Kang Jiaqi
  Momoko Kobori
  Erika Sema
  Varatchaya Wongteanchai

Champions

Singles

 Magdaléna Rybáriková def.  Zhu Lin, 6–2, 6–3

Doubles

 Eri Hozumi /  Miyu Kato def.  Katy Dunne /  Julia Glushko, 6–4, 6–2

External links 
 2017 Kangaroo Cup at ITFtennis.com
 Official website

2017 in Japanese tennis
2017 ITF Women's Circuit
2017
May 2017 sports events in Japan